Isaiah Turner may refer to:
 Isaiah Turner (footballer)
 Isaiah Turner (entrepreneur)